Kartikeya, also known as Skanda, Subrahmanya, Shanmukha, and Murugan, is the Hindu god of war. He is the son of Parvati and Shiva, the brother of Ganesha and a god whose legends have many versions in Hinduism. Kartikeya has been an important deity in the Indian subcontinent since ancient times, worshipped as Mahasena and Kumara in North India and is predominantly worshipped in the state of Tamil Nadu and other parts of South India, Sri Lanka, Singapore, Malaysia and Mauritius as Murugan. 

Murugan is widely regarded as the "God of the Tamil people". It has been postulated that the Tamil deity of Murugan was syncretised with the Vedic deity of Subrahmanya following the Sangam era. Both Muruga and Subrahmanya refer to Kartikeya.

The iconography of Kartikeya varies significantly; he is typically represented as an ever-youthful man, riding or near an Indian peafowl, called Paravani, bearing a vel and sometimes with an emblem of a rooster upon his banner. Most icons show him with only one head, but some show him with six heads which reflect the legend surrounding his birth. He is described to have aged quickly from childhood, becoming a philosopher-warrior, destroyed the demons Tarakasura, Simhamukha and Surapadma, and taught the pursuit of an ethical life and the theology of Shaiva Siddhanta. He has inspired many poet-saints, such as the aforementioned Arunagirinathar.

Murugan is an ancient god, traceable to the Vedic period. He was hailed as 'Palaniappa' (Father of Palani), the tutelary deity of the Kurinji region whose cult gained immense popularity in the south. Sangam literature has several works on Murugan such as Tirumurukāṟṟuppaṭai by Nakkirar and Thirupugal by poet-saint Arunagirinathar. Archaeological evidence from the 1st-century CE and earlier, where he is found with the Hindu god Agni (fire), suggests that he was a significant deity in early Hinduism. He is found in many medieval temples all over India, such as the Ellora Caves and Elephanta Caves.

Murugan is found as a primary deity in temples wherever communities of the Tamil people live worldwide, particularly in the Tamil Nadu state of India, Sri Lanka, Mauritius, Indonesia, Malaysia, Singapore, South Africa, Canada, and Réunion. The Aru Padai Veedu are the six temples of Tamil Nadu that are dedicated to him. The Kataragama temple dedicated to him in Sri Lanka attracts Tamils, Sinhalese people and Vedda people. He is also found in other parts of India, sometimes as Skanda, but in a secondary role along with Ganesha, Parvati and Shiva.

Etymology and nomenclature 

Kartikeya means "of the Krittikas". This epithet is linked to his birth. According to Hindu legends,  when Kartikeya appears on the banks of the River Ganga, he is seen by the six of the seven brightest stars of Kṛttikā nakshatra (Pleiades). These stars, personified as his mothers, all wanted to take care of him and nurse the baby Kartikeya. Kartikeya ended the dispute by growing five more heads in order to have a total of six heads so that he could look at all six mothers and let them each nurse one aspect of him.

He has 108 names according to Tamil and Sanskrit folklore.

Kartikeya is known by many names in ancient and medieval texts. Most common amongst these are Murugan, Kumara, Skanda, and Subrahmanya. Others include Aaiyyan, Cheyyon, Senthil, Vēlaṇ, Swaminatha ("ruler of the gods", from -natha king), śaravaṇabhava ("born amongst the reeds"), Arumugam or ṣaṇmukha ("six-faced"), Dandapani ("wielder of the mace", from -pani hand), Guha (cave, secret) or Guruguha (cave-teacher), Kadhirvelan, Kathiresan, Kandhan, Vishakha, and Mahasena. On ancient coins where the inscription has survived along with his images, his names appear as Kumara, Brahmanya, or Brahmanyadeva. On some ancient Indo-Scythian coins, his names appear in Greek script as Skanda, Kumara, and Vishaka. In ancient statues, he appears as Mahasena, Skanda, and Vishakha.

In Kalidasa's epic poem Kumarasambhava ("The Birth of the War God"; 5th century CE), as in most versions of the story, the gods wished for Skanda to be born in order to destroy the demons Taraka, Simhamukha, and Surapadma, in which the brothers had been granted a boon that he could be killed only by Shiva's power (Skanda was purely born of Shiva). They sent Parvati to induce Shiva to marry her. Shiva, however, was lost in meditation and was not attracted to Parvati until he was struck by an arrow from the bow of Kamadeva, the god of love, whom he immediately burned to ashes. After many years of abstinence, Shiva's seed became so powerful that the gods, fearing the result, sent Agni, the god of fire, to interrupt Shiva's amorous play with Parvati. Agni received the seed and dropped it into the Ganges from which Skanda was born.

Textual references

Ancient 
There are ancient references which can be interpreted to be Kartikeya in the Vedic texts, in the works of Pāṇini (~500 BCE), in the Mahabhasya of Patanjali and in Kautilya's Arthashastra. For example, the term Kumara appears in hymn 5,2 of the Rig Veda. The Kumara of verse 5.2.1 can be interpreted as Skanda, or just any "boy". However, the rest of the verses depict the "boy" as bright-colored, hurling weapons and other motifs that later have been associated with Skanda. The difficulty with interpreting these to be Skanda is that Indra, Agni and Rudra are also depicted in similar terms and as warriors.

The Skanda-like motifs found in Rig Veda are found in other Vedic texts, such as section 6.1-3 of the Shatapatha Brahmana. In these, the mythology is very different for Kumara, as Agni is described to be the Kumara whose mother is Ushas (goddess Dawn) and whose father is Purusha. The section 10.1 of the Taittiriya Aranyaka mentions Sanmukha (six faced one), while the Baudhayana Dharmasutra mentions a householder's rite of passage that involves prayers to Skanda with his brother Ganapati (Ganesha) together. The chapter 7 of the Chandogya Upanishad (~800–600 BCE) equates Sanat-Kumara (eternal son) and Skanda, as he teaches sage Narada to discover his own Atman (soul, self) as a means to the ultimate knowledge, true peace and liberation.

According to Fred Clothey, the evidence suggests that Kartikeya mythology had become widespread sometime around 200 BCE or after in north India. The first clear evidence of Kartikeya's importance emerges in the Hindu Epics such as the Ramayana and the Mahabharata where his story is recited. In addition to textual evidence, his importance is affirmed by the archeological, the epigraphical and the numismatic evidence of this period. For example, he is found in numismatic evidence linked to the Yaudheyas, a confederation of warriors in north India who are mentioned by ancient Pāṇini. They ruled an area consisting of modern era Haryana, Punjab, Rajasthan and Uttar Pradesh (extending into Garhwal region, Uttarakhand). They struck coins bearing the image of Skanda, and these coins are dated to be from before Kushan Empire era started. During the Kushan dynasty era, that included much of northwest Indian subcontinent, more coins featuring Kartikeya were minted. He is also found on ancient Indo-Scythian coins, where his various names are minted in Greek script.

Kartikeya was revered in major cultural centers of ancient India. For example, he was a major god for the Ikshvakus, an Andhra dynasty, as well as for the Gupta Empire. In south India, eight of the early Pallava dynasty rulers (300-550 CE) were named after Skanda or Kumara, suggesting the significance of Kartikeya by then. Kalidasa's epic poem the Kumārasambhava features Kartikeya.

Puranas 
Kartikeya is mentioned in Shaiva Puranas. Of these, the Skanda Purana is the largest Mahāpurāṇa, a genre of eighteen Hindu religious texts. The text contains over 81,000 verses, and is part of Shaivite literature, While the text is named after Skanda (Kartikeya), he does not feature either more or less prominently in this text than in other Shiva-related Puranas. The text has been an important historical record and influence on the Hindu traditions related to war-god Skanda. The earliest text titled Skanda Purana likely existed by the 6th-century CE, but the Skanda Purana that has survived into the modern era exists in many versions.

Buddhism

The earliest mention of Kartikeya in Buddhist texts may be found in the Janavasabha Sutta of the Pali Canon, where he is referred to as Sanankumāra. Here he is introduced as a deva of the rank of Mahābrahmā and a disciple of the Buddha. The Chinese translation of the Dīrgha Āgama features the same deity with the title Brahmā[sanan]kumāra (梵童子). He is described as a manifestation of Mahābrahmārāja. He has five hair coils (頭五角髻), a handsome face (顏貌端正) and emanates purple-golden light (紫金色) that surpasses the light of the other devas. In Chinese Buddhism, Skanda (also sometimes known as Kumāra (鳩摩羅天)) is known as Weituo (韋陀 or 韋馱), a young heavenly general, the guardian deity of local monasteries and the protector of Buddhist dhamma. According to Henrik Sørensen, this representation became common after the Tang period, and became well established in the late Song period. He is also regarded as one of the twenty-four celestial guardian deities, who are a grouping of originally Hindu and Taoist deities adopted into Chinese Buddhism as dharmapalas. Skanda was also adopted by Korean Buddhism, and he appears in its woodblock prints and paintings.

According to Richard Gombrich, Skanda has been an important deity in Theravada Buddhism pantheon, in countries such as Sri Lanka and Thailand. The Nikaya Samgraha describes Skanda Kumara as a guardian deity of the land, along with Upulvan (Vishnu), Saman and Vibhisana. Similarly, the 16th-century Siamese text Jinakalamali mentions him as a guardian god.

In Sri Lanka, Skanda as Kataragama deviyo (whose major shrine is at Kataragma), is a popular object of devotion among both Tamil Hindus and Sinhalese Buddhists. While many regard him as a bodhisattva, he is also associated with sensuality and retribution. Anthropologist Gananath Obeyesekere has suggested that the deity's popularity among Buddhists is due to his power to grant emotional gratification, which is in stark contrast to sensual restraint that characterizes Buddhist practice in Sri Lanka. There are Buddhist Sinhala shrines such as at Kataragama dedicated to Skanda which have historically been officiated by Hindu priests, which attracted Buddhist devotees and enjoyed royal support. Since the 1950s, states Brian Morris, the Kataragama shrine of Skanda has attracted over half a million devotional pilgrims every year, most being Buddhists.

In Mahayana Buddhism, the Mahāparinirvāṇa Sūtra mentions Kumāra as one of the eighty gods (八十神) worshiped by the common people. The Ārya Kaṇikrodhavajrakumārabodhisattava Sādhanāvidhi Sūtra (聖迦抳忿怒金剛童子菩薩成就儀軌經) (T 1796) features a section for the recitation of a mantra dedicated to the deity, where he is also paired with Iśvara. Yi Xing's Commentary of the Mahāvairocana Tantra (大毘盧遮那成佛經疏) clarifies that Kumāra is the son of Iśvara.

Jainism
According to Asko Parpola, the Jain deity Naigamesa, who is also referred to as Hari-Naigamesin, is depicted in early Jain texts as riding the peacock and as the leader of the divine army, both symbols of Kartikeya.

Iconography 
Ancient coins of the Yaudheyas, dated to 1st and 2nd century CE, show Kartikeya as a warrior with either one or six heads. Kushan coins show him with one head. In general, single head is far more common regardless of which dynasty minted them. The earliest statues discovered in Punjab and Kashmir show him with either one or six heads. The oldest sculptures such as those found in Mathura show him with one head, while six head iconography is dated to post-Gupta Empire era. All Kushan Empire era artwork show him with one head, even though there are Kushan deities such as a goddess who is shown with multiple heads.

The Kushan Empire era statues of Kartikeya, dated to 1st and 2nd-century CE, have been found at various sites in the Indian subcontinent, particularly at Mathura and Gandhara. They show him as a warrior dressed in dhoti (sheet wrapped at waist, covering the legs), armour like a warrior, spear in his right hand and a bird (rooster) in his left. There is some difference between his ancient iconography in Mathura and Gandhara artwork. The Gandhara arts show him in more a Scythian dress, likely reflecting the local dress culture prevalent in those times. Further, it is in the oldest Gandharan statues where he is shown with a bird that looks like a chicken or cock. According to Richard Mann, the bird may symbolize Kartikeya's agility and maneuverability as a warrior god, and may be a Parthian influence. His iconography symbolizes his attributes as a hunter, warrior and philosopher.

Kartikeya iconography shows him as a youthful god, dressed as a warrior, carrying the weapon called Vel. It is a divine spear, often called shakti, signifying the Kundalini shakti. He is sometimes depicted with many weapons including: a sword, a javelin, a mace, a discus and a bow although more usually he is depicted wielding the shakti or spear. His vahana (vehicle, mount) is a peacock. He has either one head or six, depending on the region or artist.

Legends 

The Epic era literature of ancient India recite numerous legends of Kartikeya, often with his other names such as Skanda. For example, the Vana Parva of the Mahabharata dedicates chapters 223 to 232 to the legends of Skanda, but depicts him as the son of Agni and Svaha. Similarly, Valmiki's Ramayana dedicates chapters 36 and 37 to Skanda, but describes him as the child of deities Rudra (Shiva) and Parvati, whose birth is aided by Agni and Ganga.

The legends of Kartikeya vary significantly, sometimes within the same text. For example, while the Vana Parva of the Mahabharata describes Skanda as the son of Agni, the Shalya Parva and the Anushasana Parva of the same text presents Skanda's legend as the son of Maheshvara (Shiva) and Parvati.

In Vana Parva, the circumstances behind Kartikeya's birth legend do not involve Shiva and Parvati. Rather it is deity Agni who goes to a hermitage of seven married Rishis (sages) and meets their seven wives. He is sexually attracted to all seven, but none reciprocate. Svaha is present there and she is attracted to Agni, but Agni is not. According to the legend, Svaha takes the form of six of the wives, one by one, and sleeps with Agni. She does not take the form of Arundhati, Vasistha's wife, because of Arundhati's extraordinary virtuous powers. Svaha deposits the semen of Agni into the reeds of River Ganges, where it develops and then is born as six headed Skanda.

A totally different legend in the later books of the Mahabharata make Shiva and Parvati as the parents. They were making love, but they are disturbed, and Shiva inadvertently spills his semen on the ground. Shiva's semen incubates in River Ganges, preserved by the heat of god Agni, and this fetus is born as baby Kartikeya on the banks of Ganges.

Some legend state that he was the elder son of Shiva, others make him the younger brother of Ganesha. This is implied by another legend connected to his birth. Devas have been beaten up by Asuras led by Taraka, because Taraka had a boon from ascetic celibate yogi Shiva that only Shiva's son can kill him. Devas learn about this boon, and plan how to get Shiva into a relationship. So, they bring Parvati into the picture, have her seduce yogi Shiva, and wed Parvati so that Skanda can be born to kill Taraka.

Kartikeya's legends vary by region. For example, in the northern and western Indian traditions Kartikeya or Skanda is the perpetual celibate bachelor, though Sanskrit texts mention Devasena as his wife. Kartikeya's youth, beauty and bravery was much celebrated in Sanskrit works like the Kathasaritsagara. Kalidasa made the birth of Kumara the subject of a lyrical epic, the Kumārasambhava.

Worship

West Bengal 

In West Bengal, Kartikeya is associated with the birth of children. He is worshipped on the last day of the Month of Kartik (October–November). It has become a trend in Bengal that the clay model of the deity is kept at night before the day of worship (usually by friends) for the newly married couple before the door of their house. The deity is worshiped the next day in the evening and is offered toys.

The deity is also worshipped during the Durga Puja festival in Bengal. Goddess Durga is accompanied by her four children Lakshmi, Saraswati, Ganesha, and Kartikeya. Kartikeya is the youngest of them visualized as a young man, riding a peacock and wielding a bow and arrows. He is stated to be Kumara, that is, a bachelor as he is unmarried. While Ganesha is paired with the rich Lakshmi, Kartikeya is paired with the learned Saraswati.

Rest of India 
Temples also exist in the rest of India in Pehowa in Haryana and Rudraprayag in Uttarakhand, with Kartik swami temples in Manali and Chamba in Himachal Pradesh.

Nepal 
Kartikeya is worshipped as Kumar in Nepal both by Hindu and Buddhist Communities. The Newah community celebrates Sithi Nakha: Festival dedicated to Sithi Kumar. Sithi Nakha (Kumar Shashthi) is celebrated on this sixth day of the waxing moon, according to the lunar calendar, in the Lunar month of Jestha. The festival is celebrated by cleaning water sources like wells, ponds and stone spouts and ending it with a grand Newah feast of six different varieties of Newarhi food including Wo or Waa (fried lintel bread) and Chatamari (Newah pizza).
The Festival is traditional Environment day as houses, courtyards, streets and allies are cleaned during this day. It is believed that cleaning such water sources will bring in rain for good cultivation of crops. It is also celebrated to welcome monsoon as this was the ideal time to set up rice seedbeds. The most of Newah communities also mark the festival as the end of Dewaali, to worship their family deities.

Andra Pradesh 
In Andhra Pradesh and Telangana, he is worshipped as Subrahmanya, Kumara Swamy, Skanda, Subba Rayudu or depending on the place. Important temples include Mopidevi, Biccavolu, Skandagiri, Secunderabad and Mallam and as Bala Subrahmanya on Indrakeeladri, Vijayawada.

Karnataka 
In Karnataka, the deity that is worshipped as Subrahmanya where he is regarded as Lord of the serpents in temples like Kukke Subramanya Temple, and Ghati Subramanya.

Murugan  

Murugan is an ancient god, traceable to the Vedic period. He was hailed as 'Palaniappa' (Father of Palani), the tutelary deity of the Kurinji region whose cult gained immense popularity in the south. Sangam literature has several works on Murugan such as Tirumugratrupadai by Nakkirar and Thirupugal by poet-saint Arunagirinathar. Archaeological evidence from the 1st-century CE and earlier, where he is found with the Hindu god Agni (fire), suggests that he was a significant deity in early Hinduism. He is found in many medieval temples all over India, such as the Kumaraswamy Temple Sandur  Ellora Caves and Elephanta Caves

Murugan is found as a primary deity in temples wherever communities of the Tamil people live worldwide, particularly in the Tamil Nadu state of India, Sri Lanka, Mauritius, Indonesia, Malaysia, Singapore, South Africa, Canada, and Réunion. The Aru Padai Veedu are the six temples of Tamil Nadu that are dedicated to him. The Kataragama temple dedicated to him in Sri Lanka attracts Tamils, Sinhalese people and Vedda people.

Textual references
The Tolkāppiyam, one of the most ancient texts of the Tamil literature, mentions cēyōṉ "the red one", who is identified with Murugan, whose name is literally Murukaṉ "the youth"; the other gods referred to in the Tolkāppiyam are Māyōṉ "the dark one" (identified with Vishnu), Vēntaṉ "the sovereign" (identified with Indra) and Korravai "the victorious" (identified with Kali) and Varunan "the sea god". Extant Sangam literature works, dated between the third century BCE and the fifth century CE glorified Murugan, "the red god seated on the blue peacock, who is ever young and resplendent," as "the favoured god of the Tamils." Korravai is often identified as the mother of Murugan.

In the Tirumurukāṟtruuppaṭai, he is called Murugu and described as a god of beauty and youth, with phrases such as "his body glows like the sun rising from the emerald sea". It describes him with six faces each with a function, twelve arms, his victory over evil, and the temples dedicated to him in the hilly regions.

The ancient Tamil lexicon Pinkalandai identifies the name Vēļ(வேள்) with the slayer of Taraka, that is Murugan among other things. Sangam literature (Paripatal) refers to Murugan as Sevvēļ (செவ்வேள் meaning the red Vēļ) and as Neduvēļ (நெடுவேள் meaning the tall Vēļ). In Tamil, the word Murukku means to kill or slay as in to destroy evil or Asuras.

Theology 

There is extensive Hindu symbolism and theology associated with Muruga. Regardless of the variance among the legends, his birth is in difficult circumstances, he is born through a surrogate after being left near a river. He is raised not by his natural mother but a host of mothers, but later he is a part of his biological family. Muruga symbolizes a union of polarities. He is handsome warrior and described as a celibate yogi. He uses his creative martial abilities to lead an army against Taraka and other demons, and described as a philosopher-warrior. He is a uniter, championing the attributes of both Shaivism and Vaishnavism.

His theology is most developed in the Tamil texts, and in the Shaiva Siddhanta tradition. He is described as dheivam (abstract neuter divinity, nirguna Brahman), as kadavul (divinity in nature, in everything), as Devan (masculine deity), and as iraivativam (concrete manifestation of the sacred, saguna Brahman).

According to Fred Clothey, as Murugan (also referred to as Murugan, Cheyyon), he embodies the "cultural and religious whole that comprises South Indian Shaivism". He is the philosopher and exponent of Shaiva Siddhanta theology, as well as the patron deity of the Tamil language.

Legends  

According to Raman Varadara, Murugan was originally a Tamil deity, who was adopted by north Indians. He was the god of war and knowledge in the Dravidian legends, and became so elsewhere in the Indian subcontinent too. In contrast, G. S. Ghurye states that according to the archeological and epigraphical evidence, the contemporary Murugan, Subrahmanya and Kartikeya is a composite of two influences, one from south and one from north in the form of Skanda and Mahasena. He as the warrior-philosopher god was the patron deity for many ancient northern and western Hindu kingdoms, and of the Gupta Empire, according to Ghurye. After the 7th-century, Skanda's importance diminished while his brother Ganesha's importance rose in the west and north, while in the south the legends of Murugan continued to grow. According to Norman Cutler, Kartikeya-Murugan-Skanda of South and North India coalesced over time, but some aspects of the South Indian iconography and mythology for Murugan have remained unique to Tamil Nadu.

In the Tamil legends he has two consorts, Devayanai (identified with Devasena) and Valli. Many of the major events in Murugan's life take place during his youth, and legends surrounding his birth are popular in Tamil Nadu. This has encouraged the worship of Murugan as a child-God, very similar to the worship of the child Krishna in north India.

Worship

Southern India 

Murugan is a major deity among the Hindus of Tamil Nadu, Kerala, Karnataka, Andhra Pradesh and Telangana.

Murugan is considered the god of Tamil language and he is mentioned a lot in Sangam literature. The six abodes of Murugan, together referred to as Arupadai Veedu, that are mentioned in Thirumurugatrupadai, written by Nakkeerar and in Thirupugal, written by Arunagirinathar. Each of these temples, all in Tamil Nadu, has a unique history and different reason to worship Murugan:
 Palani Murugan Temple
 Swamimalai Murugan Temple
 Thiruchendur Murugan Temple
 Thirupparamkunram Murugan Temple
 Thiruthani Murugan Temple
 Pazhamudircholai Murugan Temple 

Temples in Kerala dedicated to Subrahmanya (as Kartikeya is known in the region) include Haripad, Neendoor, Kidangoor, Kodumbu, Panmana and Payyanur. The temple to him in Udayanapuram is historically connected to the temple to his deity father, Shiva, in Vaikom. 

Festivals pertaining to Murugan are:
 Thai Poosam during January – February month is celebrated as a 6-day festival. According to Hindu mythology, it is said that Vel is given to him on this day by his mother, Parvati. and came in front of everyone with his vahana, his peacock. On Thai Poosam day, Kavadis and Palkudams are taken by devotees in procession around Chhedanagar. Special Abhishekams are performed to the Moolavar and Utsavar. Annadhanam is provided to all devotees participating in the functions. In the night, Murugan is taken in procession accompanied by Nadaswaram, Veda Parayanam around Chhedanagar.
 Vaikasi Visakam day, (during May –June month), Kavadis and Palkudams are taken by devotees in procession around Chhedanagar.
 Skanda Sashti during October–November month is celebrated as a 6-day festival. Spiritual discourses by learned scholars and/or music concerts by popular artists from South or from Mumbai are organized.

Malaysia 

Murugan is revered by the Tamil people in Malaysia and other South-East Asian countries such as Singapore and Indonesia. Thaipusam is one of the important festivals celebrated. Sri Subramanyar Temple at Batu Caves temple complex in Malaysia is dedicated to Murugan, which has a 42.7-m-high statue of Murugan at the entrance, the largest Murugan statue in the world. There are some other temples in Malaysia such as:
 Kallumalai Temple in Ipoh
 Arulmigu Balathandayuthapani Temple, Penang and Nattukkottai Chettiar Temple, Penang
 Sannayasi Andavar Temple in Cheng, Malacca
Sri Marathandavar Bala Dhandayuthapani Alayam, Maran, Pahang
Sri Kandaswamy Kovil, Brickfields, Kuala Lumpur

Sri Lanka 
In Sri Lanka Muruga is worshipped by Sri Lankan Tamils as Murugan and also by the Sinhalese as Kataragama deviyo , a guardian deity of Sri Lanka. Numerous temples exist throughout the island. He is a favourite deity of the common folk everywhere and it is said he never hesitates to come to the aid of a devotee when called upon. In the deeply Sinhalese south of Sri Lanka, he is worshipped at the Kataragama temple, where he is known as Kathiravel or Kataragama deviyo. Local legend holds that Murugan alighted in Kataragama and was smitten by Valli, one of the local girls. After a courtship, they were married. This event is taken to signify that Murugan is accessible to all who worship and love him, regardless of their birth or heritage. The Nallur Kandaswamy temple, the Maviddapuram Kandaswamy Temple and the Sella Channithy Temple near Valvettiturai are the three foremost Murugan temples in Jaffna. The Chitravelayutha temple in Verukal on the border between Trincomalee and Batticaloa is also noteworthy as is the Mandur Kandaswamy temple in Batticaloa. The late medieval-era temple of the tooth in Kandy, dedicated to the tooth relic of the Buddha, has a Kataragama deiyo shrine adjacent to it dedicated to the veneration of Skanda in the Sinhalese tradition. Almost all Buddhist temples house a shrine room for Kataragama deviyo reflecting the significance of Murugan in Sinhala Buddhism.

By the 16th century, the Kataragama temple had become synonymous with the worship of Skanda-Kumara who was a guardian deity of Sinhala Buddhism. The town was popular as a place of pilgrimage for Hindus from India and Sri Lanka by the 15th century. The popularity of the deity at the Kataragama temple was also recorded by the Pali chronicles of Thailand such as Jinkalmali in the 16th century. There are a number of legends both Buddhist and Hindu that attribute supernatural events to this very locality. Scholars such as Paul Younger and Heinz Bechert speculate that the rituals practiced by the native priests of Kataragama temple indicate Vedda ideals of propitiation. Hence, they believe that the area was important in Vedda culture and was later taken over by Buddhists and Hindus in the medieval period.

United Kingdom 

There are a lot of Murugan Temples in the United Kingdom that are built by British Tamils. Sri Murugan Temple at Manor Park in London and Murugan Temple in Highgate Hill, London to name a few. Throughout the year Tamils in United Kingdom, celebrate Murugan Festivals like Thaipusam, Skanda Shasti, Karthikai Deepam, Vaikasi Visakam, Mahasivarathri in grand fashion.

Tamil devotees of Murugan take part in Kavadi possession on Thaipusam day every year and this practice is followed by Tamils in Europe and North America as well. It's worth to take note of the temple chariot (Ther) procession every year organized by the London Sri Murugan Temple. It was estimated that more than 15000 people attended during the annual event in 2022.

The Highgate Hill Murugan Temple also known as Archway Murugan Temple located in London is a famous temple with the main deity as Murugan. In 1966, Hindu British Tamils formed the Hindu Association of Great Britain to foster the tamil Saiva Siddhanta religion and its form of worship and be a unifying force among Tamils from various parts of the world. In 1973, a Thiruchendur Murugan vigraham (statue) was specially made from Kumbakonam was installed with special rites in October 1973. The advent of the Murugan vigraham and the regular abhishekams and poojas further intensified religious fervour. Subsequently, to meet the spiritual needs of the devotees of Murugan, a Temple was built in 1979. The Prana Prathishtha for Murugan at this temple was held on the auspicious day of Vaikasi Visakam in May 1982. The temple celebrates all Murugan festivals along with an annual temple chariot festival.

Other countries

Sri Thendayuthapani Temple is a major Hindu temple in Singapore. Murugan temples also exist in several western countries like United States of America, Canada, United Kingdom, Australia, New Zealand, Germany and Switzerland.

Explanatory notes

References

Citations

General bibliography 

 
 

 Mani, Vettam. Puranic Encyclopedia. 1st English ed. New Delhi: Motilal Banarsidass, 1975.
 G. V. Tagare, Dr. The Skanda-Purana (23 Vols.), Motilal Banarsidass. 2007.

External links

Inuvil kanthan Temple
Muruga in Sangam literature
Mailam a Muruga Temple in the Cross Roads

Beauty gods
Hindu gods
Kaumaram
Sri Lankan deities
Tamil deities
Tutelary gods
War gods
Fortune gods